The Newfoundland wolf (Canis lupus beothucus) was a subspecies of grey wolf that was native to Newfoundland. As a food source, the species would prey and rely on the Newfoundland Caribou. During the autumn and early winter, some wolves would turn white while others remained dark enough to look black.

Description
It was described as being a medium-sized, slender-skulled wolf with a white pelt, though melanists also occurred. In comparison to its mainland relatives it bears a striking difference in its internal accessory cusp angles allowing for distinction between subspecies. The last specimen was reportedly killed in 1911.

Taxonomy
This wolf is recognized as a subspecies of Canis lupus in the taxonomic authority Mammal Species of the World (2005). In 1912, Gerrit S. Miller Jr have concluded that in North America, specifically west of the Mississippi River and Hudson Bay, and north of the Platte and Columbia rivers, there are three types of wolves: timber-wolf, plains-wolf, and tundra-wolf.

Recent sightings
In 2019 a wolf was shot in Newfoundland after being confused for a coyote. DNA evidence found it, and a second wolf found on Newfoundland to be a Labrador wolf, which are often seen in neighbouring Labrador but rare on Newfoundland.

See also 
 Labrador wolf

References

Further reading
 
 

Canines
Wolf
Mammal extinctions since 1500
Extinct mammals of North America
Extinct animals of Canada
Subspecies of Canis lupus
Mammals described in 1937
Taxa named by Glover Morrill Allen